The Iberian War was fought from 526 to 532 between the Byzantine Empire and the Sasanian Empire over the eastern Georgian kingdom of Iberia—a Sasanian client state that defected to the Byzantines. Conflict erupted among tensions over tribute and the spice trade.

The Sasanians maintained the upper hand until 530 but the Byzantines recovered their position in battles at Dara and Satala while their Ghassanid allies defeated the Sasanian-aligned Lakhmids. A Sasanian victory at Callinicum in 531 continued the war for another year until the empires signed the "Perpetual Peace".

Origin
After the Anastasian War, a seven-year truce was agreed on, yet it lasted for nearly twenty years. Even during the war in 505, Emperor Anastasius I had already started fortifying Dara as a counter to the Persian fortress city of Nisibis for a looming conflict. In 524–525, the Persian shah Kavadh I (r. 488–531) proposed that Emperor Justin I adopt his son, Khosrow I; the priority of the Persian king was to secure the succession of Khosrow, whose position was threatened by rival brothers and the Mazdakite sect. The proposal was initially greeted with enthusiasm by the Roman Emperor and his nephew, Justinian but Justin's quaestor, Proculus, opposed the move. Despite the breakdown of the negotiations, it was not until 530 that war on the main eastern frontier began. In the intervening years, the two sides preferred to wage war by proxy, through Arab allies in the south and Huns in the north.

Tensions between the two powers were further heightened by the defection of the Iberian king Gourgen to the Romans. According to Procopius, Kavadh I tried to force the Christian Iberians to become Zoroastrians, and in 523, under the leadership of Gourgen, they rose in revolt against Persia, following the example of the neighboring Christian kingdom of Lazica. Gourgen received pledges by Justin I that he would defend Iberia; the Romans then recruited Huns from the north of the Caucasus to assist the Iberians.

War
Violence escalated at various points where the power of the two empires met: in 525 a Roman fleet transported an Aksumite army to conquer Himyarite Yemen and in 525–526, Persia's Arab allies, the Lakhmids, raided Roman territories on the edge of the desert. The Romans were interested in gaining influence in Yemen to protect Christian interests there (see Christian community of Najran) as well as to dominate the spice and silk trade routes to India which were under Persian control.

By 526–527, overt fighting between the two empires had broken out in the Transcaucasus region and upper Mesopotamia; the Persians continued to exert pressure on the Romans to obtain funds from them. Following the emperor Justin I's death in 527, Justinian I acceded to the imperial throne. The early years of war favored the Persians, by 527 the Iberian revolt had been crushed, a Roman offensive against Nisibis and Thebetha in that year failed and forces attempting to fortify Thannuris and Melabasa were prevented from doing so by Persian attacks.

In 528, the Persians pressed on from Iberia to capture forts in eastern Lazica. Attempting to remedy the deficiencies revealed by these Persian successes, Justinian reorganised the eastern armies by dividing the command of the magister militum of the East in two and appointing a separate magister militum of Armenia over the northern portion. The most important Roman initiative on the southern front in 528 was Belisarius's expeditions to Thannuris, where he tried to protect Roman workers undertaking the construction of a fort right on the frontier. His forces were defeated by Xerxes during the battle of Thannuris and he had to retreat to Dara.

Damaging raids on Syria by the Lakhmids in 529 also encouraged Justinian to strengthen his own Arab allies, helping the Ghassanid leader Al-Harith ibn Jabalah turn a loose coalition into a coherent kingdom which was able to gain the upper hand against the Lakhmids over the following decades. In 530, Belisarius led the Romans to victory over a much larger Persian force under Perozes at the Battle of Dara, while Sittas and Dorotheus defeated a Persian army under Mihr-Mihroe at the Battle of Satala. In 531, Belisarius was defeated by Persian and Lakhmid forces at the Battle of Callinicum but during the summer, the Romans captured some forts in Armenia and repulsed a Persian offensive. The Roman failure at Callinicum was followed by a commission of inquiry, the result of which was the dismissal of Belisarius from his post. Azarethes, the Persians' commander at Callinicum, was also stripped of his ranks due to his failure to capture any significant fortification.

Truce
Justinian's envoy, Hermogenes, visited Kavadh immediately after the Battle of Callinicum to re-open negotiations but without success. Justinian took steps to bolster the Roman position, trying, at the same time, to engage Kavadh diplomatically. Justinian tried to make an alliance with the Axumites of Ethiopia and the Himyarites of Yemen against the Persians but his alliance proposal failed. The Persians conducted the Siege of Martyropolis but abandoned it as Kavadh died shortly afterwards and in spring 532, new negotiations began between the Roman envoys and the new Persian king, Khosrow I, who needed to devote his attention to securing his position. The two sides finally came to an agreement and the Eternal Peace, which lasted less than eight years, was signed in September 532. Both sides agreed to return all occupied territories and the Romans to make a one-off payment of 110 centenaria (11,000 pounds of gold). The Romans recovered the Lazic forts, Iberia remained in Persian hands but the Iberians who had left their country were allowed to remain in Roman territory or to return to their native land.

See also
 Aksumite–Persian wars
 Lazic War

References

Sources
 
 
 

 
Wars of Justinian I
Roman–Sasanian Wars
Ancient history of Georgia (country)
6th-century conflicts
520s conflicts
530s conflicts
6th century in Iran
6th century in Georgia (country)
520s in the Byzantine Empire
530s in the Byzantine Empire
Wars of Khosrow I
Wars involving the Sasanian Empire
520s
530s